Offrethun is a commune in the Pas-de-Calais department in the Hauts-de-France region of France.

Geography

Population

Places of interest
 The church of St. Etienne, dating from the nineteenth century.
 The eighteenth century manorhouse of Escault.
 Vestiges (the motte) of an old castle.

See also
Communes of the Pas-de-Calais department

References

Communes of Pas-de-Calais